Terre Haute South Vigo High School is a public high school located in Terre Haute, Indiana. As the name implies, the school's district covers the southern portion of Terre Haute, as well as most of southern Vigo County, the county in which Terre Haute is located.

The school is located at 3737 S 7th St, Terre Haute, Indiana 47802.

History

It was first constructed in 1971 along with Terre Haute North Vigo High School. It is located near the northern edge of Honey Creek Township at 7th and Davis streets. Most of the school is one story. It contains Terre Haute's only planetarium, the Allen Memorial Planetarium.

Terre Haute South Vigo High is a consolidation of Terre Haute William H. Wiley High School (1912-1971) and Honey Creek High School (1926-1971). Honey Creek was involved in earlier consolidations as Blackhawk High (1919–71), Pimento High (1919–61), Prairie Creek High (1917–61), Prairieton High (1924–27) were consolidated into Honey Creek.  Wiley itself was the second high school in Terre Haute, opening in 1912.
After its founding, North added students from Terre Haute State High (a 'laboratory school' for Indiana State University) in 1978. The 'lab school' continued to educate elementary students through 1992.

Terre Haute W. Wiley HS Gym (pictured) was the home of Indiana State basketball from 1923 to 1928.

Demographics
The demographic breakdown of the 1,861 students enrolled in 2014-2015 was:
Male - 53.0%
Female - 47.0%
Native American/Alaskan - 0.2%
Asian/Pacific islanders - 4.0%
Black - 6.4%
Hispanic - 3.3%
White - 78.6%
Multiracial - 7.5%

44.3% of the students were eligible for free or reduced lunch. For 2014–2015, this was a Title I school.

Athletics
THS has won a state championship in girls tennis (2001) and in girls basketball (2002).

THS has multiple active Fall, Winter, and Spring sports.

Notable alumni 
Armon Bassett, basketball player
Cam Cameron, football coach
Jose Pablo Cantillo, actor  
Dylan Schneider, country singer
Brian Evans, NBA forward
Tony McGee, NFL tight end 
A. J. Reed, baseball player
Jill Bolte Taylor, neuroanatomist
Danny Etling, NFL quarterback
Timmy Herrin, baseball player

Wiley High School alumni
Junius Bibbs, Negro league infielder
P. Pete Chalos, longest-serving mayor of Terre Haute
Ray S. Cline, CIA official
Norman Cottom, NBA basketball player and later, head basketball coach at Wiley
Ernest R. Davidson, chemistry professor
William King Harvey, CIA officer
Rev. Nicholas Hood, Sr., civil rights activist, minister, and politician
Martin David Jenkins, pioneer in educational psychology
Alvy Moore, actor
Abe Silverstein, NASA engineer

See also
 List of high schools in Indiana

References

External links
 Official website

Public high schools in Indiana
Former Southern Indiana Athletic Conference members
Education in Terre Haute, Indiana
Schools in Vigo County, Indiana
Indiana State Sycamores men's basketball
Buildings and structures in Terre Haute, Indiana
1971 establishments in Indiana